In Italian folklore, Lariosauro is a lake monster said to live in Lake Como in Italy, about  north of Milan.

In 1946, eyewitnesses allegedly reported seeing a reptile-like animal swimming in the waters of the lake. It was called lariosauro, the same name used a century before to name a prehistoric reptile whose fossilized remains were found by the lake (Lariosaurus balsami). A weekly of Como, a week after the first article, wrote it was a sturgeon, but the sturgeon as well as the monster appear to be more simply a hoax invented by the press.

There were other sightings, or alleged sightings, in Lake Como.

 In 1954 in Argegno a creature with round muzzle and back and webbed paws.
 In August 1957 an enormous monster in the waters between Dongo and Musso.
 In September 1957 a strange animal whose head was described as similar to a crocodile head.

Skeptic researcher Giorgio Castiglioni, who studied these cases, thinks that the animal of 1954 was an otter, the monster of August 1957 a hoax, the beast of September 1957 possibly a pike, and the 2003 eel was a group of fish swimming together.

Italian legendary creatures
Legendary reptiles
Water monsters

it:Mostro lacustre#Lago di Como